Alexander Mronz (born 7 April 1965) is a former tennis player from Germany, who turned professional in 1987.

Mronz played right-handed, and won one doubles title (1988, Schenectady) in his career. Mronz reached his highest individual ranking on the ATP Tour on April 8, 1991, when he became the world No. 73.

Mronz is famous for being the opponent of Jeff Tarango in a third round match at 1995 Wimbledon, having already knocked out Sjeng Schalken and Kenneth Carlsen to get to that stage. Mronz was leading by a set and a break, when Tarango was defaulted after losing his temper with the umpire, Bruno Rebeuh, following a couple of code violations. Tarango walked off the court in anger. Tarango's wife, Benedict, later slapped Rebeuh across the face. Mronz then lost to the world No. 1, Andre Agassi, in the fourth round.

Mronz also reached the third round of the 1994 Australian Open, losing from 2 sets up against former world No. 1 and three-time Australian Open champion Mats Wilander (who was currently in the process of coming back to the sport), 6–4, 7–5, 3–6, 4–6, 3–6.

Career finals

Doubles (1 title, 4 runner-ups)

References

External links
 
 

1965 births
Living people
German male tennis players
Tennis players from Cologne
West German male tennis players